Madame Chrysanthème may refer to:
 Madame Chrysanthème (novel), 1887 story by Pierre Loti
 Madame Chrysanthème (opera), 1893 opera by André Messager, based on the novel